Jesús María Coronado Caro S.D.B. (January 18, 1918 – December 31, 2010) was a Colombian Prelate of Roman Catholic Church.

Biography
He was born in Cienega, Colombia and ordained a priest on August 31, 1947, from the religious order of Salesians of Don Bosco. He was appointed as prefect to the Ariari on January 19, 1964, and as bishop of the Diocese of Girardot on February 10, 1973. His ordainment as bishop occurred on March 24, 1973. He was then appointed to Diocese of Duitama-Sogamoso on July 30, 1981, and retired from diocese on June 21, 1994. He died 31 December 2010 at the age of 92.

See also

Notes

1918 births
2010 deaths
People from Boyacá Department
20th-century Roman Catholic bishops in Colombia
Participants in the Second Vatican Council
Salesian bishops
Roman Catholic bishops of Girardot
Roman Catholic bishops of Duitama-Sogamoso
Roman Catholic bishops of Granada en Colombia